Elvira Holzknecht (born 27 September 1973) was an Austrian luger who competed during the 1990s and early 2000s. A natural track luger, she won three medals in the women's singles event at the FIL World Luge Natural Track Championships with two silvers (1992, 1996) and a bronze (2000).

Holzknecht also won four medals at the FIL European Luge Natural Track Championships with two silvers (1997, 1999) and two bronzes (1993, 1995).

References
FIL-Luge profile
Natural track European Championships results 1970-2006.
Natural track World Championships results: 1979-2007

External links
 

1973 births
Living people
Austrian female lugers
20th-century Austrian women
21st-century Austrian women